is a 1981 Japanese pink film directed by Tetsuji Takechi. It is a remake of Takechi's 1964 pink film of the same name, and is considered the first hardcore pornographic film to be released theatrically in Japan.

Background
Maverick theater and film director Tetsuji Takechi had directed Japan's first big-budget pink film in 1964 with Daydream. He directed more films in the 1960s, including Black Snow 1965, which resulted in a high-profile obscenity trial. During the 1970s he concentrated on writing projects, and served as the host of a successful television series, The Tetsuji Takechi Hour for the previous decade. In 1981, the then 68-year old Takechi decided to return to film with a hardcore remake of Daydream. Takechi again chose Akira Takeda, Nagisa Oshima's cinematographer between 1965 and 1968, to shoot his film.

Noticing Kyōko Aizome in one of her nude photo magazine appearances, Takechi chose the then unknown actress to star in the film. After the film's release, Aizome added to the controversy by admitting to having performed actual sexual intercourse on camera. Though, as Japanese law required, sexual organs and pubic hair were fogged on screen, the Asahi Shimbun called it a breakthrough film as Japan's first hardcore pornographic movie, and Aizome received national notoriety from starring in the film, thereby becoming Japan's first hardcore pornographic star. Her name became a selling-point for future films such as Kyōko Aizome's Somber Reminiscence (1983). Sexual acts in the movie are unsimulated.

Cast

References

Sources

External links 
 
 Daydream official site

1981 films
1980s pornographic films
1980s exploitation films
Films based on works by Jun'ichirō Tanizaki
Films directed by Tetsuji Takechi
Japanese erotic films
Remakes of Japanese films
Pornographic horror films
1980s Japanese films